Victoria Loukianetz (formal transliteration Viktoriya Lukyanets) (born 20 November 1966) is a Ukrainian-born operatic soprano with an active career singing leading roles at the Vienna State Opera, La Scala, and other European opera houses. She has also appeared in leading roles at the Metropolitan Opera in New York City.

She was born in Kyiv and graduated in solo singing from the R. Glier Kyiv Institute. At the Vienna State Opera she has specialised in bel canto roles including leading soprano roles in Linda di Chamounix, I puritani, La traviata, Rigoletto, L'elisir d'amore, The Barber of Seville, and The Magic Flute.

Dates
1989 – became a soloist of the National Opera of Ukraine.
1994 – became a soloist of the Vienna State Opera
December 1995 – made her house debut at La Scala
1999 – was awarded the title of "Person of the Year" in the nomination of «Culture and Art».
2001 – was awarded the title of People's Artist of Ukraine.

References

External links
Official website
Victoria Loukianetz - soprano at Fischer Artists International

Ukrainian operatic sopranos
1966 births
Living people
Musicians from Kyiv
21st-century Ukrainian women opera singers
20th-century Ukrainian women opera singers